Niki Bakogianni (born 9 June 1968) is a retired Greek high jumper. She was born in Lamia.

Biography
She is best known for winning a silver medal at the 1996 Summer Olympics after a tough competition with Stefka Kostadinova, who eventually became Olympic champion. This was Bakogianni's second silver medal that year, as she had placed second in the European Indoor Championships.

Bakogianni had several honours in minor athletics competitions, such as the Mediterranean Games and the Balkan Games. She won the gold medal in the latter three times (1990 in Istanbul, 1992 in Sofia and 1994 in Trikala).

Her personal best jump of 2.03 metres is the current Greek record.

After retiring she has worked as a coach. She coaches high jumper Konstadinos Baniotis.

Achievements

Note: Results with a Q, indicate overall position in qualifying round.

See also
 High Jump Differentials - Women

References

External links

1968 births
Living people
Sportspeople from Lamia (city)
Greek female high jumpers
Athletes (track and field) at the 1992 Summer Olympics
Athletes (track and field) at the 1996 Summer Olympics
Athletes (track and field) at the 2000 Summer Olympics
Olympic athletes of Greece
Olympic silver medalists for Greece
Greek athletics coaches
Medalists at the 1996 Summer Olympics
Olympic silver medalists in athletics (track and field)
Mediterranean Games silver medalists for Greece
Mediterranean Games bronze medalists for Greece
Mediterranean Games medalists in athletics
Athletes (track and field) at the 1987 Mediterranean Games
Athletes (track and field) at the 1991 Mediterranean Games
Athletes (track and field) at the 1997 Mediterranean Games